The Metropolitan Baptist Church, located at 151 West 128th Street on the corner of Adam Clayton Powell Jr. Boulevard in the Harlem neighborhood of Manhattan, New York City, was originally built in two sections for the New York Presbyterian Church, which moved to the new building from 167 West 111th Street.  The chapel and lecture room were built in 1884-85 and were designed by John Rochester Thomas, while the main sanctuary was constructed in 1889-90 and was designed by Richard R. Davis, perhaps following Thomas's unused design. A planned corner tower was never built.

In 1918, the church was acquired by the Metropolitan Baptist Church, a congregation founded in 1912 which was one of the first African American congregations in Harlem. They moved to this building from the Metropolitan Baptist Tabernacle at 120 West 138th Street, which later became Liberty Hall, a focus of the Back-to-Africa movement.

The church was designated a New York City Landmark in 1981, and was listed on the National Register of Historic Places in 1982.

Description
Despite the split construction, the granite-faced building, which combines Romanesque Revival and Gothic Revival elements, holds together as a single design. The building is two and one half stories topped by a tremendous slate roof shaped as a partial cone.  The front facade features groups of stained glass, Gothic-arched lancet windows at various levels. Thin finialed towers are prominent on the west facade of the building.  The total effect is "handsome" and "monumental".

See also
List of New York City Landmarks
National Register of Historic Places listings in New York County, New York

References
Notes

External links

Metropolitan Baptist Church website

Churches in Harlem
Properties of religious function on the National Register of Historic Places in Manhattan
Gothic Revival church buildings in New York City
Churches completed in 1890
19th-century Presbyterian church buildings in the United States
Baptist churches in New York City
Harlem